Arda Güler (born 25 February 2005) is a Turkish footballer who plays for Süper Lig club Fenerbahçe and the Turkey national team.

Club career

Early career 
Güler started his youth career at Ankara-based club Gençlerbirliği, in 2014. He joined Fenerbahçe youth ranks in 2019.

Fenerbahçe 
Güler signed a two-and-a-half-year-long professional contract with Fenerbahçe, on 13 January 2021. He is considered as a wonderkid and seen as a big prospect for future.

2021–22 season 
Güler made his senior debut as a substitute player against Finnish club HJK in the play-off round encounter of the 2021–22 UEFA Europa League. Held at Şükrü Saracoğlu Stadium, on 19 August 2021, it ended 1–0 for Fenerbahçe. In his first Süper Lig match, on 22 August 2021, he provided the assist allowing Miha Zajc to score the 1–0 in the 89th minute of the game.

He started getting more playing time as the 2021–22 season progressed. In March 2022, Güler became the youngest goalscorer in Süper Lig history, having just turned 17 three weeks earlier. By May 2022, Güler had scored 3 goals and delivered 3 assists in just 255 minutes of playing time. After an impressing start to his career, it was reported that big European clubs like Arsenal, Liverpool, Bayern Munich, Borussia Dortmund, Barcelona and PSG showed their interest in signing him.

On March 17, 2022, Fenerbahçe announced to sign three years contract with him.

2022–23 season 
In the start of 2022–23 season, Güler was given the number 10, which has a special meaning for Fenerbahçe fans, being the number of club's legend Alex de Souza. He played his first match of the season against Kasımpaşa and scored 2 goals in 21 minutes of play.

International career
Güler is a youth international for Turkey, having played up to the Turkey U21s. He debuted with the senior Turkey national team in a friendly 2–1 win over the Czech Republic on 19 November 2022.

Career statistics

Club

International

References

External links 
 

2005 births
Living people
People from Altındağ, Ankara
Turkish footballers
Turkey international footballers
Turkey youth international footballers
Footballers from Ankara
Association football midfielders
Fenerbahçe S.K. footballers
Süper Lig players